Finn is a fictional pagan warlock eco-terrorist created by Pat Mills. He first appeared in British fortnightly anthology comic Crisis in 1989 in the strip Third World War and later moved to an eponymous series in 2000 AD after Crisis was cancelled in 1991.

Publication history
The character was popular but the series ended in 1996. According to David Bishop the reason the character was suspended was due to concerns that he was in danger of duplicating the appeal of Mills's Sláine. Mills has speculated that part of the reason was because some readers were complaining in the letters page about Finn "being a sinister witch and saying his authentic pagan practices were a bad example to readers".

Plot summary
Finn is the alias of Paul Phillips. In Third World War it is established that Paul was once a soldier in the British Army stationed in Northern Ireland, but he deserted to become Finn, an eco-terrorist fighting to save the planet from multi-national corporations. Third World War began as a relatively realistic story set in 2000, with very little in the way of fantasy or science fiction elements, but that changed as Finn became more prominent.

In the eponymous strip in 2000 AD it emerged that the leaders of the corporations were in fact a secret society of powerful aliens called Newts. In this strip Finn was a mini-cab driver in Plymouth by day, and a white witch fighting the aliens by night. He used military equipment alongside magical items such as the Hand of Glory.

Bibliography
He first appeared as a supporting character in the series Third World War in the comics magazine Crisis; then in the eponymous strip in 2000 AD:

Finn:
 "Finn Book 1" (with Pat Mills/Tony Skinner, with art by Jim Elston (1-10) and Kevin Wicks (5-10), in 2000 AD #770-779, 1992)
 "Finn Book 2" (with Pat Mills/Tony Skinner and Jim Elston/Kevin Wicks, in 2000 AD #807-816, 1992-1993)
 "Origins of Finn" (with Pat Mills and Liam Sharp, in 2000 AD #924-927, 1995)
 "Interventions" (with Pat Mills and Paul Staples, in 2000 AD #928-949, 1995)
 "Season of the Witch" (with Pat Mills and Paul Staples, in 2000 AD #991-999, 1996)

Reprints 
 "Finn Book 1" (in Classic 2000 AD #13-14, 1996, Judge Dredd Megazine #329, 2012)

References

External links
The 2000 AD ABC #40: Finn at YouTube 
Finn at Barney 
Finn at the International Catalogue of Superheroes

2000AD Podcast Ep109 – Pat Mills interview pt1 via Everything Comes Back to 2000 AD

Comics by Pat Mills
2000 AD comic strips
2000 AD characters
Eco-terrorism in fiction